Beitang District is one of six urban districts of Wuxi, Jiangsu Province, People's Republic of China.

Administrative subdistricts
The  district has jurisdiction over five subdistricts.

External links

County-level divisions of Jiangsu
Wuxi